Fat Bob's Feet is a full-length album by the Punk band Toy Dolls. It is one of the more popular pieces recorded by the band and included such punk favourites as Bitten by a Bed Bug, The Sphinx Stinks and bonus single A-side Turtles Crazy! that wasn't included in original album track list. Kids In Tyne & Wear is the reworking of Kim Wilde classic Kids in America, one most often covered songs by the punk rock bands.
'Fat Bob's Feet is a rare late The Toy Dolls album that doesn't contain any classic/symphony instrumental adaptation.

Track listing
All tracks by Michael Algar

  "Gloomy Intro/Toy Doll Tonic" – 0:55
  "Fat Bob's Feet!" – 2:46
  "We Quit the Cavalry" – 2:59
  "The Sphinx Stinks" – 2:18
  "Rodney's Memory" – 2:35
  "Olga Crack Corn" – 1:09
  "Bitten by a Bed Bug" – 3:02
  "Kids In Tyne & Wear" – 3:15
  "Frankie's Got the Blues" – 2:35
  "A Bunch O' Fairies" – 2:43
  "Yellow Burt" – 1:05
  "Back in '79" – 2:51
  "The Coppers Copt Ken's Cash!" – 2:30
  "Toy Doll Tonic/Gloomy Outro" – 1:22
  "Turtle Crazy!" – 2:44

Personnel
 Michael "Olga" Algar - vocals, guitar
 John "K'Cee" Casey - bass, vocals
 Martin "Marty" Yule - drums, vocals

References

External links
 Full album lyrics
 Fat Bob's Feet page on The Toy Dolls website

Toy Dolls albums
1991 albums